Grace Christian Academy (GCA) is an accredited  Preschool-12th grade private, evangelical, Christian school located in Kankakee, Illinois.

GCA serves students in Kankakee County, Iroquois County, and Will County.

History 
In 1973, Grace Baptist Church in Kankakee, Illinois, founded Grace Baptist Academy as a school for kindergarten through sixth grade. In 1975 the academy expanded to serve junior high students, and in 1977, added high school classes. It is a private, non-profit corporation.

In the summer of 1978, Grace Baptist Church broke ground on a new educational annex, which was completed and dedicated in May 1979. As the school grew, the church purchased additional land and added more classroom space.

In December 2012, Grace Baptist Academy changed its name to Grace Christian Academy, "to better represent the students and faculty made up of multiple Christian denominations". 

In January 2020, GCA was granted accreditation through the Association of Christian Schools International. 

Until the beginning of the 2020 school year, the school was part of the Illinois Christian Conference Association for athletic competitions. In the fall of 2020, GCA became affiliated the Illinois High School Association (IHSA) for sports and other extra-curricular activities. GCA joined the River Valley Conference for athletic competitions, effective for the 2021 school year.

Notable alumni
Don Bacon - Don Bacon is a Republican member of the United States House of Representatives, representing the 2nd congressional district of Nebraska since 2017. Before his political career, he served in the United States Air Force for 29 years, retiring as a Brigadier General.

References

External links
 

1973 establishments in Illinois
Educational institutions established in 1973
Christian schools in Illinois
Kankakee, Illinois
Schools in Kankakee County, Illinois
Private high schools in Illinois
Private middle schools in Illinois
Private elementary schools in Illinois
Nondenominational Christian schools in the United States